Palha Carga is a settlement in the western part of the island of Santiago, Cape Verde. It is situated 2 km south of Chã de Tanque and 4 km southwest of Assomada.

References

Villages and settlements in Santiago, Cape Verde
Santa Catarina, Cape Verde